Michael McPherson (born July 21, 1982, in Otsego, Michigan, U.S.) is an American pair skater. With former partner Kristen Roth, he is the 2001 World Junior bronze medalist. They won the silver medal at the 2000-2001 Junior Grand Prix Final and competed for one season on the senior Grand Prix. After that partnership broke up following the 2003–2004 season, McPherson competed with Emma Phibbs.

Results

Pairs
(with Amanda Ross)

(with Roth)

(with Phibbs)

N = Novice level; J = Junior level

External links
 
 Roth and McPherson Return After Year's Absence

American male pair skaters
Living people
1982 births
World Junior Figure Skating Championships medalists
21st-century American people